A conservation officer is a law enforcement officer who protects wildlife and the environment. A conservation officer may also be referred to as an environmental technician or technologist, game warden, forest ranger, forest watcher, forest guard, forester, gamekeeper, investigator, wilderness officer, wildlife officer, or wildlife trooper.

History 
Conservation officers can be traced back to the Middle Ages (see gamekeeper). Conservation law enforcement goes back to King Canute who enacted a forest law that made unauthorized hunting punishable by death. In 1861, Archdeacon Charles Thorp arranged purchase of some of the Farne Islands off the north-east coast of England and employment of a warden to protect threatened seabird species. The modern history of the office is linked to that of the conservation movement and has varied greatly across the world.

History in New York State 
Conservation officers in New York State are known as "environmental conservation officers", or ECOs. The position was created in the late nineteenth century. Originally, they were known as "game protectors". The first game protectors recorded comprised a group of eight men authorized to arrest anyone who killed wildlife on protected land. Their job was to protect game and catch poachers. They also chose to protect streams from pollution. In 1960, their title was changed to "conservation officers", then in 1970, they were renamed "environmental conservation officers", after the Conservation Department and the State Health Department merged to become the "Department of Environmental Conservation". At the same time, the role's status was changed, giving ECOs more legal power than they had previously had.

Education 
Conservation officers generally have a degree in areas specific to criminal justice, fish and wildlife management, recreation management, wildlife resources, or a science major related to these. Most start out their careers as a trainee under the supervision of an experienced conservation officer. After graduation and completion of the trainee program, many go on to law enforcement training to become a peace officer. In America, conservation officers must also take and pass the state civil service exam for ECOs.
The Western Conservation Law Enforcement Academy is the academy that all Officers employed in western Canada including Yukon, British Columbia, Alberta, Saskatchewan and Manitoba must graduate from in order to be appointed as Officers in their respective jurisdictions. The program is 6 months long with about 2 of those months spent as on-the-job training with a direct supervisor. Training includes dress and deportment, investigations, firearm handling, use of force, swiftwater rescue, off-road vehicle use, search warrant application and execution and much more.

Recognizing the wardens' roles
As noted at the North American Game Warden Museum, confronting armed poachers in rural and even remote locations can be lonely, dangerous and even fatal work for game wardens.  Recognition of the ultimate sacrifice of these officers at this museum is considered to be important, concomitant to recognition at the National Law Enforcement Officers Memorial.

Officers are exposed to other risks beyond being killed by hunters, trappers and armed fishermen.  Motor vehicle, boating, snowmobile and airplane accidents, animal attacks, drowning, and hypothermia are other risk they face while on duty.

In North America game wardens are typically employees of state or provincial governments.  26 of the 50 U.S. states have government departments entitled Department of Natural Resources or a similar title.  These departments typically patrol state or provincial parks and public lands and waterways dedicated to hunting and fishing, and also enforce state or provincial game and environmental laws on private property.  In some states such as Maryland, Massachusetts, and Connecticut, conservation officers serve in the role of marine law enforcement as well, responsible for the enforcement of local, state, and federal boating laws along with search and rescue and homeland security.

Game wardens/conservation officers are front and center in keeping out (or in check) invasive species.

In an increasingly interconnected and globalized world, their concerns are much more comprehensive than local enforcement.  While conservation officers enforce wildlife, hunting, and game laws, they have transitioned to aiding other law enforcement agencies with drug enforcement, serving warrants, and at times provide effort to homeland security. They also enforce broader conservation laws, such as the Endangered Species Act, the Migratory Bird Treaty Act of 1918 and similar laws/treaties. or the Wild Animal and Plant Protection and Regulation of International and Interprovincial Trade Act (in Canada) which implements the Convention on the International Trade in Endangered Species of Wild Flora and Fauna  As necessary, they will work in tandem with appropriate national or federal agencies, such as the U.S. Fish and Wildlife Service or Environment Canada.

Conservation officers by region

Canada
British Columbia Conservation Officer Service
Ontario Conservation Officers
Prince Edward Island Conservation Officers
Protection de la faune du Québec (Québec fish and wildlife services)
Manitoba conservation officers
Alberta fish and wildlife services
New Brunswick conservation officers
Yukon departement of fish and wildlife services
North West territoires fish and game 
Nunavut wildlife protection officers
Canadian Wildlife and environmental protection officer (Canadian game officers)
Departement of Fisheries And Oceans Canada officers.
Canadian Park wardens 
British Columbia Park ranger services
NCC conservation officers

United States

Notable game wardens
Guy Bradley
Dave Jackson

See also
Pennsylvania DCNR rangers
North American Game Warden Museum
Park ranger
Trooper
Gamekeeper

References

Bibliography

External links
 Association of Fish & Wildlife Agencies.
 North American Wildlife Enforcement Officers Association.

Wildlife conservation
Law enforcement occupations
 

de:Wildhüter